I Love You is a 2005 Croatian drama film directed and written by Dalibor Matanić.

Plot
Krešo is a successful young copywriter who works for a marketing company in Zagreb. He largely ignores his girlfriend Ana, preferring to spend time with his high school friends in rounds of alcohol, drugs and sex.

When one day Krešo causes a death of a woman while driving under the influence, and gets infected with HIV from a subsequent blood transfusion, his life is turned upside down. He is left by his girlfriend, fired from his job, and gradually abandoned by his friends - until he meets a good-natured waitress...

Cast
 Krešimir Mikić - Krešo
 Ivana Roščić - Waitress
 Ivana Krizmanić - Ana
 Zrinka Cvitešić - Squash girl
 Nataša Janjić - Nataša
 Bojan Navojec - Žac
 Leon Lučev - Mario
 Angelo Jurkas - Robi
 Ana Stunić - Escort girl
 Božidar Orešković - Krešo's father
 Biserka Ipša - Krešo's mother

Reception
In a favorable 2007 review in The New York Times, Jeannette Catsoulis describes the film as a "bleak drama [which] is an unusually perceptive scrutiny of absence and emptiness", emphasized further by gray and pastel tones of Branko Linta's cinematography.

Croatian Film Association's database of Croatian films describes I Love You as a film with a modern style, dealing with an interesting and somewhat intriguing topic, but notes its one-dimensionality and predictability, arguing that characterization and depth were sacrificed in favor of the film's visual style.

References

External links
 

2005 films
2005 drama films
2000s Croatian-language films
Films directed by Dalibor Matanić
HIV/AIDS in film
Films set in Zagreb
Croatian drama films